Sergey Yuryevich Shiryayev (born 8 February 1983) is a Russian cross-country skier who competed between 2002 and 2015. His best finish at the FIS Nordic World Ski Championships was 11th in the 15 km event (9.3 miles) at the 2007 event in Sapporo, but that result was declared null and void upon announcing Shiryayev's disqualification for doping on EPO at the last day of the championships on 4 March 2007. His case was heard at the FIS Council meeting in Portorož, Slovenia in May 2007, resulting in a two-year suspension from the sport. Two other coaches also received sanctions from the Russian Ski Federation.

Shiryayev's best World Cup finish was third in a 30 km mixed pursuit event (18.6 miles) in Russia in January 2010.

At the 2010 Winter Olympics, he finished 31st in the 15 km event while not finishing the 50 km event (31.1 miles).

Cross-country skiing results
All results are sourced from the International Ski Federation (FIS).

Olympic Games

World Championships

World Cup

Season standings

Individual podiums
2 victories – (2 ) 
3 podiums – (1 , 2 )

Team podiums

 1 victory – (1 )
 1 podium – (1 )

See also 
List of sportspeople sanctioned for doping offences

References 

 FIS Doping Panel sanctions four athletes
 Shiryayev tests positive for doping.  - accessed March 4, 2007.

External links
 

1983 births
Cross-country skiers at the 2010 Winter Olympics
Doping cases in cross-country skiing
Living people
Olympic cross-country skiers of Russia
Sportspeople from Nizhny Novgorod
Russian male cross-country skiers
Russian sportspeople in doping cases